Rita Larsen (born 12 September 1935) is a retired Danish freestyle swimmer. She competed at the 1952 Summer Olympics and finished fourth in the 4 × 100 m freestyle relay, together with Mette Ove-Petersen, Greta Andersen and Ragnhild Hveger.

References

1935 births
Swimmers at the 1952 Summer Olympics
Danish female freestyle swimmers
Olympic swimmers of Denmark
Living people
Swimmers from Copenhagen